Tristan & Isolde is a 2006 British-American epic romantic drama film directed by Kevin Reynolds and written by Dean Georgaris based on the medieval romantic legend of Tristan and Isolde. Produced by Ridley Scott (who had been working on an adaptation since the mid-1970s) and Tony Scott, the film stars James Franco and Sophia Myles, alongside a supporting cast featuring Rufus Sewell, Mark Strong, and Henry Cavill. This was Franchise Pictures' last film before bankruptcy.

Plot
Set in the Dark Ages after the fall of the Roman Empire, Lord Marke of Cornwall plans to unite Britain – Celts, Picts, Angles, Saxons and Jutes – against Irish domination. The Irish king, Donachadh, thwarts this, attacking Tantallon Castle while the treaty is being negotiated. The castle's lord and his wife die, but Marke saves their young son, Tristan. Marke welcomes Tristan into his home.

Nine years later, Tristan is a warrior, loyal like a son to Marke. Tristan along with other Cornish warriors attack an Irish slave caravan. Tristan kills Morholt, the leader of the army, his father's killer, and the betrothed of Donachadh's daughter, Princess Isolde.

Tristan is severely wounded in the fight and believed dead, but he is only suffering the effects of Morholt's poisoned sword. Put out to sea on a funeral boat, Tristan washes up on the shores of Ireland and is found by Isolde and her maid, Bragnae. Isolde hides him and nurses him back to health. Warned by Bragnae not to reveal her true identity, Isolde tells Tristan her name is Bragnae and she is a lady-in-waiting at the court. Isolde and Tristan fall in love and begin a romance. The two lovers must separate after Tristan's boat is discovered. Tristan returns to Cornwall, receiving a hero's welcome.

Plotting to defeat Britain, Donachadh proposes a peace treaty, promising Isolde in marriage to the winner of a tournament. Tristan wins the tournament on behalf of Marke, unaware Donachadh's daughter is the woman he fell in love with. When Tristan finds out the truth, he is heartbroken, but accepts it since her marriage to Marke will end "one hundred years of bloodshed."

Marke and Isolde are married. Marke is kind to Isolde and genuinely falls in love with her. Isolde grows fond of Marke, but her heart still belongs to Tristan. Tristan is cold and distant towards Marke, who does not understand why. Tristan tells Isolde how painful it is to see her with Marke, and Isolde tells Tristan that they can be together again, in secret. Tristan is torn between his love for Isolde and his loyalty to Marke, but he eventually gives in to Isolde; they renew their love and begin an affair. The affair is discovered by Lord Wictred, a Saxon chieftain and longstanding dissenter to Marke's leadership. Wictred and Donachadh conspire to use the affair to overthrow Marke, with Wictred getting Marke's throne in exchange.

Marke tells Tristan he believes Isolde is having an affair. Tormented by guilt, Tristan burns down the bridge where he would meet Isolde. After Marke and Isolde's coronation, Tristan attempts to end the affair, but Isolde begs him not to leave her. They are caught embracing by Marke, Donnchadh, and the other British kings. Donachadh pretends to be furious that his daughter is being treated as a "whore" and breaks the alliance. Seeing this as Marke's weakness, the other kings also part ways with him. Marke is hurt and furious over Tristan and Isolde's betrayal. However, when Isolde explains their history, Marke relents; Tristan is taken to the river and told by Isolde that Marke is letting them and Bragnae leave together. Tristan tells Isolde that if he leaves with her, they will be remembered for all time as those "whose love brought down a kingdom." Tristan pushes the boat carrying Isolde and Bragnae away from the shore and runs off to the ensuing battle.

Simultaneously, Melot, Marke's nephew and Tristan's friend, who has always been resentful of his uncle's long favoring of Tristan, shows Wictred the hidden passage into the castle. Wictred tells Melot he will become king when Marke is defeated. However, once in the passage, Wictred stabs Melot and sneaks his army into the castle. Marke and his forces swiftly become trapped between Donachadh's army outside the castle and Wictred's men within.

Tristan sneaks back into the castle via the tunnel, where he finds Melot; they reconcile right before Melot passes away. Tristan helps Marke's soldiers secure the castle, becoming mortally wounded in combat with Wictred, whom he still manages to kill. Tristan, Marke and his soldiers emerge, presenting Wictred's severed head to Donachadh. Marke urges the British kings to aid them in making Britain a single, free nation. Inspired, the British attack Donachadh and his army.

Marke carries Tristan to the river, where they meet Isolde. With his last breath, Tristan tells Isolde; "I don't know if life is greater than death. But love was more than either." Isolde buries Tristan, planting two willows by the grave, which grow intertwined. Isolde then disappears from history, never to be seen again. Marke defeats the Irish, unites Britain, and rules in peace until the end of his days.

Cast

Production
In the mid-1970s, before the beginning of the filming of The Duellists, Ridley Scott pitched the idea of a film adaptation of the medieval romantic legend of Tristan and Iseult, and he planned to release this film as his second movie. However, the project never materialized at the time, and Scott pitched the idea of Legend during the filming of The Duellists as a replacement of this project. The film was finally released in 2006 with Kevin Reynolds as the director and with Scott as the producer.

Release

Box office
Tristan & Isolde opened theatrically in 1,845 North American venues on January 13, 2006. In its first weekend, the film earned $6,583,135 and ranked eighth in the domestic box office. The film ended its run on March 30, having grossed $28,047,963.

Critical reception
The film received mixed reviews from critics. On Rotten Tomatoes, the film has a 31% score based on 121 reviews, with an average rating of 4.90/10. The site's consensus states: "Competent but somewhat static, Tristan & Isolde doesn't achieve the sweeping romanticism that it aims for." Metacritic reports a 49 out of 100 based on 30 reviews, indicating "mixed or average reviews".

Manohla Dargis of The New York Times writes, "there is something undeniably pleasant about an entertainment like Tristan & Isolde that delivers exactly what it promises, no less, no more." She adds: "There is some fairly bloodless fighting and some very chaste lovemaking."

See also

 List of historical drama films
 Late Antiquity
 List of films based on Arthurian legend
 Tristan and Iseult

References

External links

 
 
 
 

2006 films
20th Century Fox films
Film
2006 romantic drama films
2000s war drama films
Adultery in films
2000s action drama films
American epic films
American romantic drama films
American war drama films
Arthurian films
British epic films
British romantic drama films
British war drama films
Czech romantic drama films
Czech war drama films
English-language Czech films
English-language German films
Films directed by Kevin Reynolds
Films set in Cornwall
Films set in England
Films set in Ireland
Films set in castles
Films set in the 6th century
Films shot in the Czech Republic
German epic films
German romantic drama films
German war drama films
Romantic epic films
Scott Free Productions films
War epic films
Franchise Pictures films
Films set in the Middle Ages
Films scored by Anne Dudley
Films produced by Elie Samaha
Czech epic films
2000s English-language films
2000s American films
2000s British films
2000s German films